Antuco Volcano is a stratovolcano located in the Bío Bío Region of Chile, near Sierra Velluda and on the shore of Laguna del Laja.

Eruptions 
The first registered eruption occurred in 1624 but it is known that the volcano experienced some activity in the 16th century. The 1624 eruption was strombolian forming a lava flow and resulting in the ejection of pyroclasts. Beginning with this eruption many more were recorded as the volcano lies near an Andean mountain pass transited by the Spanish.

24–30 April 2013 
In April 2013, there were reported signs of activity sighted by nearby inhabitants - a pilot even reported ash spewing from the volcano. The Volcanic Ash Advisory Center in Buenos Aires, Argentina,  investigated and determined that only trace gases and steam had emerged from Antuco.

In literature 

 The Voyage of the Beagle by Charles Darwin
 Les Enfants du capitaine Grant, also known as In Search of Castaways: A Romantic Narrative of the Loss of Captain Grant of the Brig Britannia and of the Adventures of His Children and Friends in His Discovery and Rescue, by Jules Verne

References

Bibliography

Volcanoes of Biobío Region
Stratovolcanoes of Chile
Mountains of Chile
South Volcanic Zone